Tania Sachdev (born 20 August 1986) is an Indian chess player, who holds the FIDE titles of International Master (IM) and Woman Grandmaster (WGM). She is a two-time Indian women's chess champion in 2006 and 2007, one-time Asian women's chess champion in 2007  and three-time and current Commonwealth Women's Chess Champion in 2016, 2018 and 2019. She is also a chess presenter and commentator.

Early years
Born in Delhi, Sachdev was introduced to the game by her mother, Anju, at the age of 6. Her parents provided her with professional training. She achieved her first international title when she was eight. She was coached by K.C. Joshi during her early years. As a child, Tania Sachdev won multiple events. Her career successes are under-12 Indian champion, Asian U14 girls' champion in 2000 and bronze medalist at the 1998 World Youth Chess Championships in the Girls U12 division. In 2002, she won the Asian Junior Girls Championship in Marawila.

National and international acclaim
In 2005, Sachdev became the eighth Indian player to be awarded the Woman Grandmaster title. She won India's National Women's Premier Chess Championship in 2006 and 2007. In 2007, she also won the Women's Asian Chess Championship with 6½ points out of nine rounds in Tehran. She was conferred with the Arjuna Award in 2009. In 2016, Sachdev won the best woman's prize at the Reykjavik Open and won the Commonwealth women's champion title in Kalutara.

She has played for the Indian national team in the Women's Chess Olympiads since 2008, the Women's World Team Chess Championship in 2009 and 2011, the Women's Asian Team Chess Championship since 2003, the 2006 Asian Games, and the 2009 Asian Indoor Games. Sachdev won the individual bronze medal for board 3 at the 2012 Women's Chess Olympiad in Istanbul, four team silver medals (in 2008, 2009, 2012, and 2014) and four individual ones (three silver and one bronze) at the Women's Asian Team Championship.

In 2015, Sachdev won a silver medal in the Asian Continental Women's Rapid Chess Championship.

Sachdev has presented a Fritztrainer Strategy DVD for Chessbase and was a member of the official commentary team for the 2013 (Chennai) World Championship Match between Magnus Carlsen and Viswanathan Anand. In July 2019, Sachdev won Commonwealth women's championship and defended her title.

Personal life
Sachdev completed her schooling at Modern School in Vasant Vihar in Delhi and did her graduation at Sri Venkateswara College.

She is sponsored by Red Bull. She married Delhi-based architect Viraj Kataria in November 2014.

References

External links
 
 
 

1986 births
Living people
Chess International Masters
Chess woman grandmasters
Indian female chess players
Chess Olympiad competitors
Chess players at the 2010 Asian Games
Sportswomen from Delhi
21st-century Indian women
21st-century Indian people
Asian Games competitors for India
Recipients of the Arjuna Award
Modern School (New Delhi) alumni